Entrance to the Grand Canal, Venice is an oil on canvas painting by Paul Signac, executed in 1905, now in the Toledo Museum of Art, Ohio, USA. It shows the entrance to the Grand Canal in Venice, with the Dogana da Mar and Santa Maria della Salute in the background.

See also
List of paintings by Paul Signac

References

External links

1905 paintings
Paintings by Paul Signac
Paintings in the collection of the Toledo Museum of Art
Cityscape paintings of Venice